The 1973 All-Ireland Under-21 Hurling Championship was the 10th staging of the All-Ireland Under-21 Hurling Championship since its establishment by the Gaelic Athletic Association in 1964.

Galway were the defending champions, however, they were defeated by Cork in the All-Ireland semi-final.

On 11 November 1973, Cork won the championship following a 2–10 to 4–2 defeat of Wexford in the All-Ireland final. This was their sixth All-Ireland title in the grade and their fifth in six championship seasons.

Results

Munster Under-21 Hurling Championship

Quarter-finals

Semi-finals

Final

All-Ireland Under-21 Hurling Championship

Semi-finals

Final

References

Under
All-Ireland Under-21 Hurling Championship